In organic chemistry, benzyl is the substituent or molecular fragment possessing the structure . Benzyl features a benzene ring attached to a methylene group group.

Nomenclature
In IUPAC nomenclature, the prefix benzyl refers to a  substituent, for example benzyl chloride or benzyl benzoate. Benzyl is not to be confused with phenyl with the formula . 
The term benzylic is used to describe the position of the first carbon bonded to a benzene or other aromatic ring. For example,  is referred to as a "benzylic" carbocation. The benzyl free radical has the formula . The benzyl cation or phenylcarbenium ion is the carbocation with formula ; the benzyl anion or phenylmethanide ion is the carbanion with the formula . None of these species can be formed in significant amounts in the solution phase under normal conditions, but they are useful referents for discussion of reaction mechanisms and may exist as reactive intermediates.

Abbreviations
The abbreviation "Bn" denotes benzyl. For example, benzyl alcohol can be represented as BnOH. This abbreviation is not to be confused with "Bz", which is the abbreviation for the benzoyl group , or the phenyl group , abbreviated "Ph".  Confusingly, in old literature, "Bz" was also used for benzyl.

Reactivity of benzylic centers
The enhanced reactivity of benzylic positions is attributed to the low bond dissociation energy for benzylic C−H bonds. Specifically, the bond  is about 10–15% weaker than other kinds of C−H bonds. The neighboring aromatic ring stabilizes benzyl radicals. The data tabulated below compare benzylic C−H bond to related C−H bond strengths.

The weakness of the C−H bond reflects the stability of the benzylic radical. For related reasons, benzylic substituents exhibit enhanced reactivity, as in oxidation, free radical halogenation, or hydrogenolysis. As a practical example, in the presence of suitable catalysts, p-xylene oxidizes exclusively at the benzylic positions to give terephthalic acid:
CH3C6H4CH3 + 3 O2 -> HO2CC6H4CO2H + 2 H2O
Millions of tonnes of terephthalic acid are produced annually by this method.

Functionalization at the benzylic position 
In a few cases, these benzylic transformations occur under conditions suitable for lab synthesis.  The Wohl-Ziegler reaction will brominate a benzylic C–H bond:.  Any non-tertiary benzylic alkyl group will be oxidized to a carboxyl group by aqueous potassium permanganate or concentrated nitric acid:.  Finally, the complex of chromium trioxide and 3,5-dimethylpyrazole will selectively oxidize a benzylic methylene group to a carbonyl:. 2-iodoxybenzoic acid in DMSO performs similarly.

As a protecting group
Benzyl groups are occasionally employed as protecting groups in organic synthesis.  Their installation and especially their removal require relatively harsh conditions, so benzyl is not typically preferred for protection.

Alcohol protection 
Benzyl is commonly used in organic synthesis as a robust protecting group for alcohols and carboxylic acids.

 Treatment of alcohol with a strong base such as powdered potassium hydroxide or sodium hydride and benzyl halide (BnCl or BnBr)

 Monobenzylation of diols can be achieved using Ag2O in dimethylformamide (DMF) at ambient to elevated temperatures
 Primary alcohols can be selectively benzylated in presence of phenol functional groups using Cu(acac)2

Deprotection methods 
Benzyl ethers can be removed under reductive conditions, oxidative conditions, and the use of Lewis Acids.

 Removed using hydrogenolysis

 Single electron process with Na/NH3 or Li/NH3

 Benzyl protecting groups can be removed using a wide range of oxidizing agents including:
 CrO3/acetic acid at ambient temperature
 Ozone
 N-Bromosuccinimide (NBS)
 N-Iodosuccinimide (NIS)

 Trimethylsilyl iodide (Me3SiI) in dichloromethane at ambient temperature (selectivity can be achieved under specific conditions)

The p-methoxybenzyl protecting group
p-Methoxybenzyl (PMB) is used as a protecting group for alcohols in organic synthesis (4-Methoxybenzylthiol is used to protect thiols).

 Strong base such as powdered potassium hydroxide or sodium hydride and p-methoxybenzyl halide (chloride or bromide)
 4-methoxybenzyl-2,2,2-trichloroacetimidate can be used to install the PMB group in presence of:
Scandium (III) triflate (Sc(OTf)3) in toluene at 0 °C
 Trifluoromethanesulfonic acid (TfOH) in dichloromethane at 0 °C

Deprotection methods 
 2,3-Dichloro-5,6-dicyano-p-benzoquinone (DDQ)

 Conditions for deprotection of benzyl group are applicable for cleavage of the PMB protecting group

Amine protection 
The benzyl group is occasionally used as a protecting group for amines in organic synthesis.  Other methods exist.

 Aqueous potassium carbonate and benzyl halide (BnCl, BnBr) in methanol

 Benzaldehyde, 6 M HCl and NaBH3CN in methanol

Deprotection methods 
 Hydrogenation in the presence of the palladium catalyst

See also
 Benzylamine

References

External links

Aryl groups
Protecting groups